The Piaski transmitter ( Polish: Radiowo Telewizyjne Centrum Nadawcze Lublin / Piaski or short RTCN Piaski) is a facility for FM- and TV-broadcasting near Piaski in Lublin Voivodeship, Poland at . The piaski transmitter uses a 342 metre tall guyed mast antenna tower, which was built in 1990. After the collapse of the Warsaw Radio Mast the Piaski transmitter became the 4th tallest structure of Poland.

The following programmes are transmitted by Piaski transmitter.

Transmitted programmes

Digital television MPEG-4

FM radio

See also 
 List of masts
 List of tallest structures in Poland

External links 
 http://www.trawniki.hg.pl/traw/radiowtr.html
 
 Entry at Emitel
 Entry at Skyscraperpage
 http://radiopolska.pl/wykaz/pokaz_lokalizacja.php?pid=107
 http://www.dvbtmap.eu/mapcoverage.html?chid=9642

Buildings and structures completed in 1990
Radio masts and towers in Poland